is a Japanese actress, voice actress and singer born in Maruko, Nagano Prefecture and raised in Shinmachi, Gunma.

Life and career
She is most known for the roles of Matsuzaka-Sensei (Crayon Shin-chan), Manami Kasuga (Kimagure Orange Road),  Linna Yamazaki (Bubblegum Crisis), Rei Hino / Sailor Mars (Sailor Moon), Sumire Kanzaki (Sakura Wars), and Emi Ogasawara (Ghost Sweeper Mikami).

Tomizawa temporarily retired from voice acting before getting married in 2002. She came out of retirement for 2004's Disgaea and 2006's Black Lagoon. She also appeared in a number of Musical Kayou Shows as her Sakura Taisen character Sumire; she retired from the annual performances after getting married but came back for the 2005 show, the final show in 2006, and the 2007 Budoukan show. Although said to have retired from the Sakura Taisen world, she did, however, appear backstage in scenes of Hanagumi Camera and later on stage during some of the later shows.  In 2019, she also reprised her role of Sumire Kanzaki in Shin Sakura Taisen, now as the commander of the Hanagumi and as the Imperial Playhouse's general manager.

She sang a song in Sailor Moon R, "Eien no Melody" (Eternal Melody) written by Noda Kaoru and composed by Mashita Izumi. She has also recorded songs for several Sailor Moon soundtrack albums, including a version of Wham!'s "Last Christmas" (in English) for the Sailor Stars Christmas album.  Tomizawa is fluent in English as well as Japanese.

She also returned to the stage of Animelo Summer Live at the Anisama Super Game Song Live 2012 in May 2012 along with fellow Sakura Taisen cast members, Chisa Yokoyama and Urara Takano to perform as the Sakura Taisen Teikoku Kagekidan.

Personal life
She married Akira Ito in 2002.

Filmography

Television animation
The Super Dimension Cavalry Southern Cross (1984): Jeanne Francaix
Ganbare, Kickers! (1986-1987): Tetsuya
Kimagure Orange Road (1987): Manami Kasuga
High School Mystery: Gakuen Nanafushigi (1991): Mizuki Ichijo
Crayon Shin-chan (1992): Matsuzaka-sensei
Sailor Moon (1992–1997): Rei Hino / Sailor Mars
Ghost Sweeper Mikami (1993-1994): Emi Ogasawara
Saint Tail (1996): Nagata Tomoko
Those Who Hunt Elves (1996-1997): Airi Komiyama
Yu-Gi-Oh! (1998): School nurse
Oruchuban Ebichu (1999): Office Lady
One Piece (2005): Laki
Black Lagoon (2006): Roberta
Magic Kaito (2015): Chikage Kuroba a.k.a. Phantom Lady
Sakura Wars the Animation (2020): Sumire Kanzaki

Unknown date
Dr Slump: Akiko
Kinnikuman: Scramble for the Throne: Bibimba
Let's Nupu Nupu: Miss Shitara
Rhapsody: A Musical Adventure and Disgaea: Hour of Darkness: Marjoly
Sailor Moon video games: Rei Hino / Sailor Mars
Sakura Wars series: Sumire Kanzaki
Super Robot Wars Z: Edel Bernal

Original video animation
Vampire Hunter D (1985): Doris
Bubblegum Crisis (1987): Linna Yamazaki
One Pound Gospel (1988): Sakai
Bubblegum Crash (1991): Linna Yamazaki
Legend of the Galactic Heroes (1994): Elfriede von Kohlrausch
 Tenchi Muyo! Ryo-Ohki (2016): Mihoshi Kuramitsu (OVA 4)

Animated films
Project A-ko: C-Ko
Pretty Soldier Sailor Moon R: The Movie: Rei Hino / Sailor Mars
Pretty Soldier Sailor Moon S: The Movie: Rei Hino / Sailor Mars
Pretty Soldier Sailor Moon SuperS: The Nine Sailor Soldiers Unite! Miracle of the Black Dream Hole: Rei Hino / Sailor Mars

Video games
Sakura Wars (series) (1996–Present): Sumire Kanzaki
Tomb Raider (1997):  Jacqueline Natla
Thousand Arms: Metalia
Ninja Gaiden: Rachel
Ninja Gaiden Sigma 2: Rachel
Musou Orochi 2 Special: Rachel
Dead or Alive 5 Ultimate: Rachel
Dead or Alive 6: Rachel
Shin Megami Tensei: Digital Devil Saga* (2004): Jenna Angel
Shin Megami Tensei: Digital Devil Saga 2* (2005): Jenna Angel

Television drama
Oshin (1983): Onatsu

Tokusatsu
Choriki Sentai Ohranger (1995): Ms. Hino (Actor) (ep. 5)
Voicelugger (1999): Eyelash Line (Actor)
Tokusou Sentai Dekaranger (2004): Yuilwerian Mime (ep. 39)
Kamen Rider × Kamen Rider × Kamen Rider The Movie: Cho-Den-O Trilogy: Episode Blue: The Dispatched Imagin is NEW tral (2010): Mantis Imagin
Girls in Trouble: Space Squad Episode Zero (2018) Hellvira (replacing Naomi Morinaga)

Dubbing

Live-action
Baywatch, C. J. Parker (Pamela Anderson)
The Goonies (1988 TBS edition), Andrea "Andy" Carmichael (Kerri Green)
Scream 2, Maureen Evans (Jada Pinkett Smith)

Animation
Galaxy High, Booey Bubblehead
The Simpsons, Jessica Lovejoy

Others
Machi Chūka de Yarouze (BS-TBS, 2019–present), narrator

Music
As the voice of Sailor Mars from the Sailor Moon series, Tomizawa performed two international Christmas tunes, "White Christmas" and "Last Christmas". These songs also are on the Japanese Sailor Moon Christmas CDs. Both songs are in English.

References

External links
 Official agency profile 
 

1961 births
Living people
Aoni Production voice actors
Japanese video game actresses
Japanese voice actresses
People from Takasaki, Gunma
Voice actresses from Gunma Prefecture
Voice actresses from Nagano Prefecture
20th-century Japanese actresses
21st-century Japanese actresses
20th-century Japanese women singers
20th-century Japanese singers
21st-century Japanese women singers
21st-century Japanese singers